Vivild is a town located in Jutland, Denmark, with a population of 788 (1 January 2022).  It is a part of Norddjurs Municipality.

Notable people 
 Halfdan T. Mahler (1923 in Vivild – 2016) a Danish physician. He served three terms as director-general of the World Health Organization (WHO) from 1973 to 1988

References

Cities and towns in the Central Denmark Region
Norddjurs Municipality